The Bishwa Ijtema (meaning Global Congregation) is an annual gathering of Muslims in Tongi, by the banks of the River Turag, in the outskirts of Dhaka, Bangladesh. It is one of the largest peaceful gatherings in the world. The Ijtema is a prayer meeting spread over three days, during which attending devotees perform daily prayers while listening to scholars reciting and explaining verses from the Quran. It culminates in the Akheri Munajat, or the Concluding Supplication (Final Prayer), Maulana Zubair Ahmed in which millions of devotees raise their hands in front of Allah (God) and pray for world peace. The Ijtema is considered a demonstration of Muslim unity, solidarity, mutual love and respect and an opportunity to reiterate their commitment to Islamic values.

The Ijtema is non-political and therefore it draws people of all persuasions. It is attended by devotees from 150 countries. The majority of its devotees come from across Bangladesh, the world's third largest Muslim majority country.

Speakers include Islamic scholars from various countries. Bishwa Ijtema is now the second largest Islamic gatherings with 5 million adherents, after the Arba'een Pilgrimage (15-20 Million attendees), surpassing the 2-3 million worshipers that perform the Hajj in Saudi Arabia (which is one of the five pillars of Islam for Muslims). The Bangladeshi Ijtema is a modern event where Muslim participation is voluntary.

Etymology
Ijtema is an Arabic word which means 'public gathering' or 'conference'

Organization
The event is organized in January by the Bangladeshi branch of the Tablighi Jamaat, a Deobandi movement.

The congregation takes place in an area which spans over five square kilometers in Tongi, an outer suburb north of Dhaka. An extensive tent is created in the area with the help of the Government of Bangladesh. Transport is provided by state-run companies, including Biman Bangladesh Airlines, the Bangladesh Railway and the Bangladesh Road Transport Corporation (BRTC). The Bangladesh Armed Forces assists by arranging infrastructure. Despite the large number of devotees living within a confined space, generally there are very few problems of sanitation, cooking, and internal movements. It is believed to be possible because of the minimalist approach adopted by the devotees. Devotees reduce their own requirements and develop a respect for others' requirements. During the Final Prayer, huge crowds stretch from the Ijtema ground in Tongi into the Dhaka metropolitan area. Schools and offices are declared closed on the occasion.

History

The Bengali Tabhlighi Jamaat movement started in Dhaka, East Bengal during the 1950s. The first Ijtemas were organized in Chittagong (1954) and Narayanganj (1958), followed by Ijtemas at the Ramna Race Course in Dhaka in 1960, 1962 and 1965. Due to the increasing rate of participants, the government of East Pakistan allowed organizers to schedule the event annually by the River Turag in 1967. Later, the government of Bangladesh allotted 160 acres

Number of devotees
In 2001, the number of attendees was 2 million. In 2010, the number was 5 million.

Foreign devotees
Estimates of foreign devotees stand at 20,000–50,000. They come from various regions, including the South Asian Subcontinent, Russia and Central Asia, Europe, Southeast Asia, the Middle East, North Africa and the United States.

Overcrowding and weather
Due to increasing overcrowding, the Ijtema was divided into two segments with an interval of seven days from 2010. The first phase is allowed for devotees from 32 designated Bangladeshi districts. The second phase allows devotees from the remaining districts of the country. Foreign devotees are allowed in both phases.

Due to increasing overcrowding, the Ijtema was divided into four segments from 2015. The first phase is allowed for devotees from 16 designated Bangladeshi districts. The second phase allows devotees from another 16 designated Bangladeshi districts. Devotees from the remaining 32 districts of the countrywill join next year.

In 2008, the event had to be cut short to only one day due to rain and cold weather which left three attendees dead.

Gallery

See also
Raiwind Ijtima
Dawah
Spread of islam
Islamization
Darul Uloom Deoband
Nerul Aalami Markaz
Kakrail Mosque
Raiwind Markaz

References

External links
 BBC Slideshow on Biswa Ijtema 2007

Islam in Bangladesh
Tablighi Jamaat
Tongi
Islamic festivals
January events
Islamic terminology